Hesarcheh-ye Pain (also Romanized as Ḩeşārcheh-ye Pā’īn; also known as Ḩeşārcheh) is a village in Jargalan Rural District, Raz and Jargalan District, Bojnord County, North Khorasan Province, Iran. At the 2006 census, its population was 472, in 108 families.

References 

Populated places in Bojnord County